The Lighthouse of the Orcas is a 2016 Spanish-Argentine drama film directed by Gerardo Olivares. It stars Maribel Verdú and Joaquín Furriel.

It is based on the novel Agustín corazónabierto by Roberto Bubas.

Together with Olivares' two previous films, Entrelobos (2010) and Brothers of the Wind (2015), The Lighthouse of the Orcas forms a trilogy about the animal-human relationship.

Synopsis  
In trying to help her son find an emotional connection, a mother travels with her autistic son to Patagonia to meet a park ranger and wild orcas.

Cast

Production 
A joint Spanish-Argentine co-production, the film was produced by Wanda Vision, Historias Cinematográficas, Puenzo Hermanos and Pampa Films and it had support from TVE, ICAA and the Ibermedia programme.

Shooting locations included the Patagonia (Argentina) and Fuerteventura (Spain).

Release 
Distributed by Wanda, the film was theatrically released in Spain on December 16, 2016. The opening in Argentine theatres was scheduled for 13 April 2017 by Disney. Netflix acquired the global distribution rights.

See also 
 List of Spanish films of 2016

References

External links 
  on Netflix
 
 

2016 films
Argentine drama films
Spanish drama films
2010s Spanish-language films
2016 drama films
Films_about_autism
Films shot in Argentina
Films shot in the Canary Islands
2010s Spanish films
2010s Argentine films